USS Doneff (DE-49) was an  which served in the United States Navy in the Pacific Theater of Operations. The only encounter with the Imperial Japanese Navy was the sighting of one or two A6M Zero fighters during the operational time spent in the Aleutian Islands.

DE-49, originally intended for transfer to Britain, was launched on 24 July 1942 by Philadelphia Navy Yard; retained by the U.S. Navy; named Doneff on 4 March 1943, and commissioned on 10 June 1943.

Namesake
John Lincoln Doneff was born on 12 February 1920 in Newark, Ohio He was appointed a Midshipman from the 17th Ohio District to the United States Naval Academy on 30 June 1939. His summer midshipman cruise (8-15 June 1940) saw him serving on the battleship . He graduated with the Class of 1943 on 19 June 1942. Commissioned Ensign upon graduation, he served briefly in the Twelfth Naval District (2-7 July 1942), then joined the heavy cruiser  on 16 July 1942. He was killed in action in the Battle of Tassafaronga on 30 November 1942.

Service history
Doneff arrived at San Diego, California, as escort for a convoy on 9 September 1943. On 27 September she got underway for Alaskan waters and escort duty.  From April 1944 she cruised between Attu and the Kurile Islands to report enemy contacts, forced landings of aircraft, and weather, and to guide planes and serve as rescue vessels in case of forced landings.  She returned to Attu on 19 May for escort duty between Alaskan ports.  Except for a period as guard ship again from 1 to 21 August 1944, she continued to escort convoys until 7 January 1945 when she sailed for San Francisco, California, and overhaul.

Arriving at Pearl Harbor on 9 March 1945 for exercises, Doneff got underway on 20 March to escort a convoy to Eniwetok, arriving there on 28 March.  She served at Guam on patrol and local escort duty, then made anti-submarine patrols off Saipan until 6 August, when she sailed for Okinawa as a convoy escort for the USS Indianapolis, which carried the atomic bomb that was dropped on Hiroshima, returning to Saipan on 19 August.  From 25 August to 23 September, she joined the destroyer  to receive the surrender of the Japanese garrison on Marcus Island and support occupation of the island by American troops.

After brief overhaul at Guam, Doneff put to sea on 11 October, arriving at San Pedro on 26 October.  Doneff was decommissioned on 22 December 1945 at San Diego, and sold for scrapping on 9 January 1947.

Awards

References

External links

 

Evarts-class destroyer escorts
World War II frigates and destroyer escorts of the United States
Ships built in Philadelphia
1942 ships